Miss Venezuela 2022 was the 69th Miss Venezuela pageant held at the Poliedro de Caracas in Caracas, Venezuela on November 16, 2022.

At the end of the event, Amanda Dudamel of Región Andina crowned Diana Silva of Distrito Capital as her successor as Miss Venezuela 2022. She will represent Venezuela at the Miss Universe 2023 pageant.

Also, Isbel Parra of Región Guayana crowned Andrea Rubio of Portuguesa as her successor as Miss Venezuela International 2022. She will represent Venezuela at the Miss International 2023 pageant.

Results

Placements
Color key

Order of Announcements

Top 10

Top 5

Interactive Beauty Gala
The following awards were given by fan vote on the official website.

Judges
The judges for the final telecast include:
Ángel Sánchez – Fashion designer
Ly Jonaitis – Miss Venezuela 2006 from Guárico
María Elena de Olivares – General director of Brucen Venezuela
Mariem Velazco – Miss International 2018 from Venezuela
Mario Aranaga – Fashion journalist
Maritza Pineda – Miss Venezuela 1975 from Nueva Esparta
Sócrates Serrano – Actor
Valerie Frangie – Creative director
Norma Pérez – Director of Ashoka Region Andina
Rafael Morantes – President of Samsung Venezuela
Toto Aguerrevere – Writer

Contestants 
Contestants from 23 states, and the Capital District competed for the title.

Notes

References

External links
Miss Venezuela Official Website

Miss Venezuela
2022 beauty pageants
2022 in Venezuela